In the Depths of Our Hearts is an American film produced in 1920 by the Royal Gardens Film Company of Chicago. The film was made in Chicago and on a farm in Wisconsin and features an African American cast. It is considered a lost film. It depicts a  story of love separated because of skin tone. The film was positively reviewed by the Chicago Defender, which praised its dramatic qualities and its action scenes.

Royal Gardens Film Company was reported to have made two other films including a comedy before folding.

Cast 
Herman DeLavalade
Augusta Williams
Irene Conn
Virgil Williams
Charles H. Allen

References

1920 films
Films about racism in the United States